Dr. Ing. Giancarlo Morolli is an Italian philatelist who signed the Roll of Distinguished Philatelists in 2010.

Profession
Morolli is a management advisor in information technologies, a freelance journalist and a member of the Professional Association of Journalists of Italy. He is also a member of the FIP Thematic Commission since 1968.

References

Italian philatelists
Signatories to the Roll of Distinguished Philatelists
Living people
1939 births
People from Rimini